Marbot may refer to:

People

Marbot family members, including:
 Jean-Antoine Marbot (1754–1800), French general and politician
 Adolphe Marbot (1781–1844), French general
 Marcellin Marbot (1782–1854), French general

Literature

 Mémoires du Général Baron de Marbot, an 1891 autobiography by Marcellin Marbot
 Sir Andrew Marbot, a 1981 historical fiction novel by Wolfgang Hildesheimer

Places

France:
 Avenue des Généraux Marbot, an avenue in Altillac
 Hôtel Marbot, a château in Tulle, seat of the departmental council of Corrèze
 Place Marbot, a square in Beaulieu-sur-Dordogne

Canada:
 Marbot Lake, a lake in Eeyou Istchee James Bay

Other uses

 A walnut cultivar

See also